Darin Glen Peterson is an American politician from Utah. A Republican, he was a member of the Utah State Senate from 2006 until 2008, representing the state's 24th senate district in Juab, Piute, Sanpete, Sevier, Tooele, and Wayne Counties including the city of Nephi.

Peterson, the son of former Utah legislator Cary G. Peterson, is a graduate of Utah State University.

Sources

http://www.votesmart.org/bio.php?can_id=50653

Living people
Republican Party Utah state senators
Utah State University alumni
People from Nephi, Utah
1966 births
21st-century American politicians